Church Pulverbatch is a civil parish in Shropshire, England.  It contains 19 listed buildings that are recorded in the National Heritage List for England.  Of these, two are listed at Grade II*, the middle of the three grades, and the others are at Grade II, the lowest grade.  The parish is mainly rural, but most of the listed buildings are in the village of Church Pulverbatch.  The buildings include houses and associated structures, farmhouses, farm buildings, a church and items in the churchyard, and a public house.


Key

Buildings

References

Citations

Sources

Lists of buildings and structures in Shropshire